Kotel Pass is a mountain pass in the Balkan Mountains (Stara Planina) in Bulgaria. It connects the Kotel and Petolachka crossroads.

The pass is on one of the main routes connecting northern and southern Bulgaria.

References
Description of town and pass of Kotel

Mountain passes of Bulgaria
Balkan mountains
Landforms of Sliven Province